The 2011 Sacred Heart Pioneers football team represented Sacred Heart University in the 2011 NCAA Division I FCS football season. The Pioneers were led by eighth year head coach Paul Gorham and played their home games at Campus Field. They are a member of the Northeast Conference. They finished the season 5–6, 3–5 in NEC play to finish in a tie for sixth place.

Schedule

References

Sacred Heart
Sacred Heart Pioneers football seasons
Sacred Heart Pioneers football